Palladam is a legislative assembly in Tiruppur district, which includes the town, Palladam. Its State Assembly Constituency number is 115. Palladam assembly constituency is a part of Tiruppur Lok Sabha constituency. The constituency is in existence since 1957 election. It is one of the 234 State Legislative Assembly Constituencies in Tamil Nadu, in India.

Demographics

Madras State

Tamil Nadu

2021 Elections

Constituency details

Election results

2021

2016

2011

2006

2001

1996

1991

1989

1984

1980

1977

1971

1967

1962

1957

References 

 

Assembly constituencies of Tamil Nadu
Coimbatore district